Empire of Ash (also known as Empire of Ash II) is a Canadian post-apocalyptic science fiction movie from 1988. The movie was re-released in 1989 as Empire of Ash II. It was followed by one sequel: Empire of Ash III. The movie is also known as Maniac Warriors.

Plot
In 2050, sometime after a nuclear war, Danielle (Melanie Kilgour) searches for her missing sister in New Idaho. All cities have been destroyed and humanity lives in small groups in the countryside. The Warriors, a government sanctioned paramilitary group, have kidnapped the healthy sister in an attempt to harvest her healthy blood. The leader of the warriors (Frank Wilson) is insane. Orion (Thom Schioler) assists Danielle.

Cast
Melanie Kilgour as Danielle
Thom Schioler as Orion
Frank Wilson as Shepherd
James Stevens as Iodine
Alexander MacKenzie as Chuck
Michele Chiponski as Baalca
Michael Bernardo as Head Raider

Reception
John Stanley gave the movie one out of five stars, finding nothing redeemable in either this movie or its sequel. It was rated 18 by the BBFC. TV Guide found the movie to be anemic, needing talent and lacking in spirit or energy, and stated that the movie had "no saving graces"

Release
The film was released on VHS in 1989.

See also
List of apocalyptic and post-apocalyptic fiction

References

Empire of Ash (1988)

1988 films
1980s science fiction films
Canadian post-apocalyptic films
Canadian science fiction films
English-language Canadian films
1980s English-language films
1980s Canadian films